A Covenant of Thorns is a one-man synthpop/darkwave project from the United States. Formed in Seattle, in 1992, by Scott-David Allen, the project is currently based in the upper midwest, outside of Chicago.

History 
After a string of smaller projects and bands, in 1992, Scott-David Allen began work on various songs with no real plan to release any of the material written.

Several years later, in 1998, at the urging of individuals who heard the songs, he released two six song EPs, A Covenant of Thorns 1 and A Covenant of Thorns 2.  The two EPs were a mixture of digital and analogue 4-track recordings.

In 1999, after the initial success of the two EPs, the first full-length album, Hallowed & Hollow, was released.  Consisting of eleven of the twelve songs from the first two EPs, the track Crown of Thorns was omitted due to a lack of space on the album.

Five years later, in 2004, the follow-up, full-length album, If The Heavens Should Fall was released.  The release was a reflective, personal and much more subdued offering.

After a decade of silence, The Fields of Flesh, a six track EP, was released in December 2014.  The release was noticeably more upbeat than If The Heavens Should Fall but still retained a slightly more modern, core A Covenant of Thorns sound.

In 2016, the six Track EP Forgotten was released.  It was the first release to feature guitars and retained the upbeat feel of the previous EP.

2017's Requiem was a dark introspective six song E.P. dealing with the passing of Scott-David Allen's father.

2018 brought the release of the third, full-length album, Shadows & Serenades.  It was noticeably more upbeat than the previous release while still exploring darker themes.

Late in 2020, the third full-length album, Black was released.  Exploring themes such as religion, love, loss and loneliness, it built upon the previous album, retaining its feel, while exploring new sounds and ideas; notably in the song Choke, which was a commentary on the treatment of women, from the Salem witch trials to current day.

Name 
According to Allen, the name A Covenant of Thorns symbolizes the contrast between everyday events:

Discography

EPs 
 1998: A Covenant of Thorns 1
 1998: A Covenant of Thorns 2
 2014: The Fields of Flesh
 2016: Forgotten
 2017: "Requiem"

Albums 
 1999: Hallowed & Hollow
 2004: If The Heavens Should Fall
 2018: Shadows & Serenades
 2020: Black

Compilations 
 1999: MP32K - The Future Is Now
 2000: Shadow Dancing
 2002: Trinity
 2005: Angelic Hauntings
 2020: Tiny Gods Who Walk Beside Us

Remixes 
 Dahlia (Phosphene Dreams Mix) - Remixed by The Joy Thieves

External links

See also 
Synthpop
Darkwave

References 

American synth-pop groups
Dark wave musicians
Electronic music groups from Washington (state)
Musical groups established in 1992